The Third Street Bridge is a historic bridge which carries Third Street across a railroad between Pine and Elm Streets in Delavan, Illinois. The bridge was built by the Kellogg Bridge Company in the 1870s and originally served as a railroad bridge at an unknown site in Tennessee. The City of Delavan purchased the bridge in 1907 and brought it to its current site on Third Street. The bridge is a double intersectional Warren pony truss; it is one of two bridges of its type remaining in Illinois and the oldest metal truss bridge in the state. The Warren truss design consists of alternating equilateral triangles along the sides of the bridge; the bridge has two sets of overlapping Warren trusses on each side, making it double intersectional.

The bridge was added to the National Register of Historic Places on May 20, 1999.

References

Road bridges on the National Register of Historic Places in Illinois
National Register of Historic Places in Tazewell County, Illinois
Metal bridges in the United States
Warren truss bridges in the United States
Bridges in Tazewell County, Illinois